Teloschistes flavicans, also known as the golden hair-lichen is a lichenized species of fungus in the genus Teloschistes, family Teloschistaceae. Recognized by its safron coloured pigmentation, this species grows on rocks and branches of trees. It was named by Norwegian botanist, Johannes Musaeus Norman.

References

Teloschistales
Lichen species
Lichens described in 1852
Lichens of Africa
Lichens of Asia
Lichens of Europe
Lichens of North America
Lichens of Oceania
Lichens of South America
Taxa named by Olof Swartz